A list of films released in Japan in 1965 (see 1965 in film).

Box-office ranking

List of films

See also 
1965 in Japan
1965 in Japanese television

References

Footnotes

Sources

External links
Japanese films of 1965 at the Internet Movie Database

1965
Lists of 1965 films by country or language
Films